The following lists events that happened during 1999 in Zimbabwe.

Incumbents
 President: Robert Mugabe 
 First Vice President: Simon Muzenda
 Second Vice President: Joshua Nkomo (until 1 July), Joseph Msika (starting 1 July)

Events

January
 January 7 - Zimbabwe says its military intervention in the Democratic Republic of the Congo is being funded by France, Libya and Angola.

References

 
1990s in Zimbabwe
Years of the 20th century in Zimbabwe
Zimbabwe
Zimbabwe